Dentiovula is a genus of sea snails, marine gastropod mollusks in the family Ovulidae.

Species
Species within the genus Dentiovula include:
Dentiovula azumai (Cate, 1970)
Dentiovula colobica (Azuma & Cate, 1971)
Dentiovula deforgesi Lorenz & Fehse, 2009
Dentiovula dorsuosa (Hinds, 1844)
Dentiovula eizoi Cate & Azuma in Cate, 1973
Dentiovula horai (Cardin, 1994)
Dentiovula mariae (Schilder, 1941)
Dentiovula masaoi Cate, 1973
Dentiovula oryza (Omi & Clover, 2005)
Dentiovula parvita Azuma, 1974
Dentiovula rutherfordiana (Cate, 1973)

References

Ovulidae